Sishan Township is a former township of Qingyuan County in the Lishui prefecture-level city of Zhejiang in China. In 2011, it was merged with the Songyuan Town into the newly formed Songyuan subdistrict.

See also
List of township-level divisions of Zhejiang

Township-level divisions of Zhejiang
Lishui